Umberto Berni (2 August 1900 – 16 May 1945) was an Italian racing cyclist. He rode in the 1925 Tour de France.

References

External links
 

1900 births
1945 deaths
Italian male cyclists
Cyclists from Florence